Phyllanthus amarus is a leafy herbal plant found in tropical regions in the Americas, Africa, India, China and South East Asia. Commons names for this plant include gale of the wind, carry me seed, seed on the leaf, pick-a-back, Bhuiavla (Hindi), Bhuiamla (Bengali), stonebreaker, dukung anak (Malay).

Description
P. amarus is a small, annual plant that grows to a height of 30-60 cm. Its thin branches spread out, and each branch has two rows of small, elliptic-oblong leaves of 5-10mm long that are arranged alternately. Its radial flowers are star-shaped and of about 2mm in size. It grows well in soil of high moisture with light shade, and reaches maturity in 2-3 months.

Constituents
P. amarus contains flavonoids (quercetin-3-0-glucoside and ruin), tannins (geraniin, amariin and gallocatechin) and alkaloids (phyllantine, quinolizidine type, securinine, norsecurinine, isobubbialine and epibubbialine).

Uses
P. amarus has been used in the traditional medicine of various cultures, including Amazonian tribes for the treatment of gallstones and kidney stones; in Ayurvedic medicine for bronchitis, anaemia, diabetes; and in Malay traditional medicine for diarrhoea, kidney ailments and gonorrhea. More recently there have been preclinical and clinical studies looking into the plant's supposed liver-protective abilities and effect on hepatitis B.

According to animal tests, it has hepatic protection against paracetamol hepatoxicity in rats.

References

amarus
Medicinal plants of Asia
Taxa named by Heinrich Christian Friedrich Schumacher